Chaoborus trivittatus is a species of phantom midges (flies in the family Chaoboridae).

References

Chaoboridae
Articles created by Qbugbot
Insects described in 1862